The Hum is the second studio album and third long play record by British rock band Hookworms, released on 10 November 2014 on Weird World, an imprint of Domino. The album title relates to the phenomenon known as The Hum.

Critical reception
The album received favourable reviews on release, as well as appearing in Loud and Quiet, The Drift and Piccadilly Records's top 10 records of 2014 lists.

Track listing

Personnel

Hookworms
 JN - Drums, percussion
 JW - Guitars, sleeves and design
 MB - Bass, synths
 MJ - Vocals, backing vocals, keyboards, synths, producing, recording, mixing
 SS - Guitars

Additional
 Published by Domino Publishing Co. Ltd
 Recorded by MJ at Suburban Home Studios, Leeds
 Mixed by MJ at Suburban Home Studios, Leeds
 Mastered by Alex Wharton, Abbey Road Studios
 Sleeves, design by JW (Idiot's Pasture)

Videos

 "The Impasse" and "On Leaving" videos directed by Joe and Toby Mortimer, artwork by Idiots Pasture.
 Video for "Radio Tokyo" directed by Sam Wiehl.

Charts

References

2014 albums
Hookworms (band) albums
Domino Recording Company albums